Scaramouche is a stock comic character.

Scaramouche may also refer to:

Arts and entertainment
 Scaramouche (novel), a 1921 novel by Rafael Sabatini
 Scaramouche (1923 film), adapted from Sabatini's novel
 Scaramouche (1952 film), starring Stewart Granger and also adapted from the novel
 Scaramouche (Sibelius) (1913), a tragic pantomime by Poul Knudsen (1889–1970), with incidental music by Sibelius
 Scaramouche, stage name of Tiberio Fiorilli (1608–1694), Italian actor
 Scaramouche, a suite for two pianos (later arranged for other combinations) by Darius Milhaud
 Scaramouche, a character in the musical We Will Rock You based on the music of British rock band Queen
 Scaramouche the Merciless, a character in Samurai Jack that is based on Sammy Davis Jr.
 Scaramouche, a character in Chinese Action RPG Genshin Impact

Other uses
 Scaramouche, a section of the Vatican Secret Archives, according to the archives published index

See also
 Scaramucce, third studio album of Rondò Venezian
 Scaramucci (disambiguation)
 Scaramuccia (music ensemble), early music ensemble founded in 2013